Homadaula anisocentra, also known as the mimosa webworm, is a species of moth in the family Galacticidae. It is considered a pest of ornamental plants. They attack the leaves of mimosa (Albizia julibrissin) and honeylocust (Gleditsia triacanthos).

This species was introduced into the United States from China in the 1940s.

Description
They are silvery gray in color and have wings covered with small, black dots. The larvae have white stripes.

References

External links
 Images and information

Galacticidae
Moths described in 1922
Moths of Japan